Colonel Panics (カーネルパニック) is a 2016 Australian-Japanese feature film directed by Cho Jinseok. It has screened at the Yubari International Fantastic Film Festival and the Buenos Aires Rojo Sangre Film Festival.

It has been described by the Asia Times as "spectacularly misogynistic" and a "a cyber giallo-infused ode to legendary Japanese director Nagisa Oshima". Asian Movie Pulse labelled it a "unique combination of cyberpunk, exploitation, and curio".

Cast 

Yusuke Miyawaki
Satomi Hiraguri

References

External links 
 

2016 horror films
Australian horror films
Japanese horror films
2016 films
2010s Japanese films